Abortiporus biennis is a species of fungus belonging to the family Meruliaceae.

Synonyms:
 Boletus biennis Bull. 1790 (= basionym)

References

Meruliaceae